The 1952 Kansas Jayhawks football team represented the University of Kansas in the Big Seven Conference during the 1952 college football season. In their fifth season under head coach Jules V. Sikes, the Jayhawks compiled a 7–3 record (3–3 against conference opponents), finished fourth in the Big Seven Conference, and outscored all opponents by a combined total of 214 to 110. They played their home games at Memorial Stadium in Lawrence, Kansas.

The team's statistical leaders included Charlie Hoag with 469 rushing yards, Bob Brandeberry with 54 points scored, and Jerry Robertson with 868 passing yards. Hoag and Oliver Spencer were the team captains.

Schedule

References

Kansas
Kansas Jayhawks football seasons
Kansas Jayhawks football